Alexander Zverev defeated top seed Stefanos Tsitsipas in the final, 6–4, 7–6(7–3) to win the men's singles tennis title at the 2021 Mexican Open.

Rafael Nadal was the defending champion, but chose not to defend his title.

Seeds

Draw

Finals

Top half

Bottom half

Qualifying

Seeds

Qualifiers

Lucky loser

Qualifying draw

First qualifier

Second qualifier

Third qualifier

Fourth qualifier

References

External links
Main draw
Qualifying draw

Abierto Mexicano Telcel - Singles
Men's Singles